Hillyard may refer to: 

Hillyard, Spokane, Washington, a neighborhood in Spokane Washington
Hillyard Township, Macoupin County, Illinois
Hillyard, Inc., specialist in maintenance of basketball courts
Hillyard Cabin, cabin in Randolph County, Arkansas on National Register of Historic Places

People with the surname
Blanche Bingley Hillyard (1863–1946), English tennis player
Dave Hillyard, American musician
George Hillyard (1864–1943), English tennis player
Lyle W. Hillyard (born 1940), American politician